Donald Ray Atkinson (February 10, 1940, in Union City, Indiana–January 11, 2008, in Santa Barbara, CA) was an American counseling psychologist and professor at the University of California, Santa Barbara (UCSB). He was known for his extensive work in multicultural counseling psychology. He was the director of training for UCSB's Counseling Psychology Program for ten years (1979-1989), and previously as Assistant Dean of the Department of Education there for four years (1975-1979). Atkinson grew up in Baraboo, Wisconsin and graduated from Baraboo High School. He served in the United States Navy for two years. He wrote a book about Baraboo: "Baraboo: A Selective History." He also wrote other books and articles about counseling. He died from pancreatic cancer in Jackson County, Oregon. He retired from the faculty of UCSB in 2002.

References

External links
Biography in Encyclopedia of Counseling

1940 births
2008 deaths
University of California, Santa Barbara faculty
20th-century American psychologists
University of Wisconsin–Madison alumni
University of Wisconsin–La Crosse alumni
University of Wisconsin–Milwaukee alumni
People from Union City, Indiana
People from Baraboo, Wisconsin
Military personnel from Indiana
Military personnel from Wisconsin
Writers from Indiana
Writers from Santa Barbara, California
Writers from Wisconsin
Deaths from cancer in Oregon
Deaths from pancreatic cancer
American psychologists